Dämmerung may refer to:
 die Dämmerung, the German word for twilight
 Dämmerung, 1893 play by Elsa Bernstein
 Dämmerung, 1978 drama by Gerhard Roth
 Dämmerung, 2006 album by German singer/songwriter Franz Josef Degenhardt
 Dämmerung, 2010 album by Turkish rapper Massaka
 "Dämmerung", song by the German folk metal band Equilibrium
 "Dämmerung", song by the Australian band Frontside
 Dämmerung, Headquarters of Vector Industries in the video game Xenosaga